This article is about the list of Clube Desportivo Primeiro de Agosto players.  Clube Desportivo Primeiro de Agosto is an Angolan football (soccer) club based in Luanda, Angola and plays at Estádio 11 de Novembro.  The club was established in 1977.

2020–2021

2011–2020

2001–2010

1991–2000

1977–1990

See also
 List of C.D. Primeiro de Agosto men's basketball players
 List of C.D. Primeiro de Agosto women's basketball players
 List of Angola international footballers

External links
 Girabola.com profile
 Zerozero.pt profile
 Soccerway profile
 Facebook profile

Notes

References

C.D. Primeiro de Agosto
C.D. Primeiro de Agosto players
Association football player non-biographical articles